Julie Ganapathi is a 2003 Indian Tamil-language psychological thriller film written, photographed, edited and directed by Balu Mahendra, starring Saritha, Jayaram and Ramya Krishnan. It is based on the 1987 Stephen King novel Misery. The film was released on 14 February 2003.

Plot 
Julie Ganapathi is a staunch fan of a popular television show Manga. Over the years, Julie grows to identify herself obsessively with the main character of the show. The author of the series, Tenkasi Balakumaran, leaves his home for a few days to be alone to write the final few episodes of Manga. On his way back home after completing his work, his vehicle gets into an accident which leaves him seriously injured and disabled. Julie rescues Bala and takes him home, but she is revealed to be emotionally unstable, and deliriously obsessed with the character in Bala's story. Julie asks Bala to allow her to read the scripts for the concluding episodes that he has just completed.

Over the next few days, she reads the story and finds the ending not to her liking. She forces Bala to rewrite the ending by various means, forcing him to escape his captor's clutches before it is too late. Soon after, Bala becomes aware of how Julie has not informed anyone of his situation and is not at all planning to release him anytime soon. As a result, he tries to escape her home. In this, he is caught and suspended to remain in his room. She also disables him from getting up.

Afterwards, a policeman investigating Bala's disappearance decides to go to the house of Julie since she has made her love for Manga known around the village. When investigating her home, he discovers that Bala was in fact being kept there. Julie then draws a weapon and kills him. She then informs Bala that they will then die together. Just to get him some time he uses the excuse of having to finish his new version of the final Manga script. With that, he finishes, tricks Julie into getting him a weapon, and with a fight, manages to kill Julie and escape. The film forwards to Bala with his family, discussing with the press his experiences, stating that she was in fact an inspiration to him.

Cast 

 Saritha as Julie Ganapathi
 Jayaram as Tenkasi Balakumaran
 Ramya Krishnan as Vijaya
 Mohan Raman as Channel's Head
 Sashikumar as Ivan
 Dhivyadharshini as Writer
 Naren as Julie's husband
 Junior Balaiah as Julie's house Watchman
 Delhi Ganesh as Inspector Ganesh
 Shanmugasundari as Neighborhood for Jayaram, Serial lover
 Vatsala Rajagopal as Vijaya's mother / Grandmother
 Amarasigamani as a police Inspector

Production 
Balu Mahendra had read the Tamil translation of Stephen King's novel, Misery, and adapted it into a screenplay. Post-release, he stated that he had not watched the American film version of the novel, Misery (1990), and was unaware that such a film had been made. He drew comparisons between the similar theme of the film, with his previous ventures Moodu Pani (1980) and Moondram Pirai (1982). Mahendra chose Jayaram to play the lead role, after having watched and been impressed with several of the actor's performances in films, as a part of jury committees for awards. The actor's Malayali background meant that he adapted the script to make the protagonist a Malayali-born settler in Tamil Nadu. Jayaram recommended Saritha's name for the film, and the actress made a comeback to cinema after an extended sabbatical. For her role, Mahendra had requested Saritha to put on ten kilograms, and after an initial period of hesitance, the actress later agreed. A major portion of the film was shot in a single room with just two actors, Jayaram and Saritha, with  Mahendra opting to use only natural light. Since the light that entered the room was diffused, Mahendra was able to film many sequences set during the day at night. The producers of the film insisted that a song was added for the commercial viability of the film and against his own wishes, Balu Mahendra shot and included a sensuous song featuring Ramya Krishnan.

Soundtrack 
The music was composed by Ilaiyaraaja.

Reception 
A reviewer from Sify wrote, "the film is dark, deadly, daring and is the best thriller to come along in years", adding that it is "recommended and a must-see for those who love thrillers". Shobha Warrier of Rediff.com also gave the film a positive review, noting "Balu Mahendra proves even after five years he has not lost his touch" and that "is a film worth watching". Malini Mannath wrote in Chennai Online, "The theme is widely different from the routine romance-action variety. There are just two characters in the frame for most of the time, and it’s up to the duo and the director to carry the film through, and keep the audience hooked to the screen. Which they’ve managed to do to a large extent". Likewise, Malathi Rangarajan of The Hindu also gave the film a positive review, praising the performances of Saritha and Jayaram, and adding that Balu Mahendra's work is a "fulfilling fare" and "that the veteran lives up to it in inimitable style". Visual Dasan of Kalki lauded the film, but was critical of the inclusion of the dance number featuring Ramya Krishnan. Although the film had a slow start at the box-office, it picked up, owing to positive word-of-mouth reviews.

References

External links 

 

2000s Tamil-language films
2003 films
2003 psychological thriller films
Films based on American horror novels
Films based on works by Stephen King
Films directed by Balu Mahendra
Films scored by Ilaiyaraaja
Films shot in Ooty
Indian psychological thriller films